Winners (Persian: برنده‌ها) is a 2022 British Persian-language drama film written and directed by Hassan Nazer. It tells the story of the journey of 2 children from a small Iranian community who find the lost Academy Award statuette of Asghar Farhadi. It was selected as the British entry for the Best International Feature Film at the 95th Academy Awards, but was not nominated.

Synopsis 
In a small provincial Iranian town, the children work hard to support their families. One day nine-year-old Yahya and his friend Leyla find a precious statue. Sharing a passion for cinema, Yahya's boss Naser Khan (Reza Naji) decides to help them find the owner.

Cast 
The actors participating in this film are:

 Parsa Maghami as Yahya
 Helia Mohammadkhani as Leyla
 Hossein Abedini as Saber
 Mahmoud Jafari as Driver
 Shahrzad Kamalzadeh as Mrs. Sadeghi
 Reza Naji as Naser Khan
 Ezzatollah Ramazanifar as Uncle Ezzat
 Asghar Semsarzade as Antique Dealer
 Martine Malalai Zikria as Mother

Production

Script 
Hassan Nazer had the conceptual idea for the film from a very young age, but it wasn't until Trump's travel ban prevented eventual winner Asghar Farhadi from picking up his Oscar for The Salesman in 2017.

Filming 
Winners was financed, developed and post-produced in Scotland and shot on Iranian territory.

Release 
The film had its world premiere at the Edinburgh International Film Festival in August 2022, where it won the Audience Award.

Reception

Critical reception 
Deadline's Anna Smith wrote: "Winners, is an ode to cinema and the joys it brings, and it also pays tribute to the great achievements of Iranian filmmakers, dedicating the work to Abbas Kiarostami, Asghar Farhadi, Majid Maijdi and Jafar Panahi. But it also highlights the contrast between film festival plaudits and real life: what the cast and crew are left with once the party’s over." Screendaily's Fionnula Halligan wrote: "Ostensibly a film in the vein of Cinema Paradiso — which it references on several occasions — this is a curio for cineastes and festivalgoers, especially given the presence of Reza Naji in a lead role... Visually, Winners also harks back to the distinctive work of the Iranian New Wave; to Kiarostami and Makhmalbaf and everyone who came before. One thing is for sure: Nazer, and everyone in his film, loves Iranian cinema."

Accolades

References

External links 

 

2022 films
2022 drama films
British drama films
2020s Persian-language films
2020s British films
Films set in Iran
Films shot in Iran
Films about films

Films about child labour